Torodora parthenopis is a moth in the family Lecithoceridae. It is found in Taiwan and northern Vietnam.

The wingspan is 13–17 mm. The forewings are yellowish orange-brown with five distinct spots along the termen. The hindwings are light greyish.

References

Moths described in 1932
Torodora